Clifford Birks (born 13 December 1910 – 1998) was an English professional footballer who played as both a right-half and at outside-right for Stoke City, Port Vale, Torquay United and Halifax Town in the 1930s.

Career

Port Vale
Birks played for Stoke St. Peters and Stoke City, before joining Port Vale in November 1929. He made his debut on 27 December 1932, in a 2–1 win over Charlton Athletic at The Old Recreation Ground, and made 21 Second Division appearances and one FA Cup appearance in the 1932–33 season. He featured 11 times in the 1933–34 and 1934–35 campaigns, scoring four goals in the last five games of the 1934–35 season. He scored three goals in 15 league games in the 1935–36 season, finding himself on the score-sheet against Tottenham Hotspur at White Hart Lane, but was released in May 1936.

Later career
He joined Torquay United of the Third Division South, but was kept out of the side due to the form of Fred Beedall and George Daniels in the 1936–37 campaign; Birks made his "Gulls" debut at Plainmoor on 16 January 1937, scoring in the 4–1 defeat to Southend United. However, this was to be his only appearance for Torquay and he left to join Halifax Town for the following season. He played just three Third Division North games for Halifax before leaving both The Shay and the English Football League. During the war he guested for Leicester City.

Career statistics
Source:

References

1910 births
1998 deaths
Sportspeople from Hanley, Staffordshire
English footballers
Association football midfielders
Stoke City F.C. players
Port Vale F.C. players
Torquay United F.C. players
Halifax Town A.F.C. players
Leicester City F.C. wartime guest players
English Football League players